Dariusz Rafał Bugajski is a Polish Navy officer, scholar and professor of public international maritime law specializing in the law of the sea, law of naval operations, naval warfare, and international security, including climate challenges.

Education 

Bugajski earned a Master of Engineering from the Polish Naval Academy and thereafter, a Master of Arts in Law from the University of Gdańsk. He received a Doctorate of Security from the Polish Naval Academy, and a habilitation in international law at the Faculty of Law at Szczecin University in 2009, and graduated from postgraduate security studies too.

Career 

Bugajski served in the 8th Coastal Defence Flotilla in Świnoujście and thereafter, as a commanding officer of an Anti-submarine Warfare Naval Ship (Fast Attack Craft) in Kołobrzeg. While in Gdynia among others, he was a vice dean of the Faculty, and vice-rector of the Polish Naval Academy for education (2016-2019). 
He is a member of the Maritime Law Commission of the Polish Academy of Science, the Shipbuilding Council Society, the International Society for Military Law and the Law of War, national expert of the Advisory Board on the Law of the Sea (International Hydrographic Organization) and expert of the Polish Navy Hydrographic Office.

Publications and editorial work 
Bugajski authored and co-authored numerous publications regarding various aspects of international law, the law of the sea, international humanitarian law, and international security. His works have appeared in the
“Revista Europea de Derecho de la Navegación Marítima y Aeronáutica” published by the University of Malaga.
He is editor-in-chief of the “International Humanitarian Law” journal published by the Polish Naval Academy in Gdynia. He serves on numerous editorial boards, including the “Maritime Security Yearbook”. His books were 
nominated for the  Mountbatten Award for Best Book by the Maritime Foundation.

 D.R. Bugajski, The Polish Naval Academy. In the Centenary of Regaining Access to the Baltic Sea, Gdynia 2019, pp. 185.  (POLISH NAVAL ACADEMY);  (REGION)
 D.R. Bugajski, Navigational Rights and Freedoms in the International Law and Practice, Polish Naval Academy, Gdynia 2021, pp. 353
 D.R. Bugajski, The legal protection of the RMS Titanic, "Santander Art and Culture Law Review", 1/2022 (8), pp. 41-60; https://www.ejournals.eu/SAACLR/2022/1-2022/art/22225/.

References 

1970 births
 International law scholars
Polish Navy officers
Polish lawyers
Polish legal scholars
Living people
University of Gdańsk alumni